Gabriel De Michèle (born 6 March 1941) is a French former footballer of Italian descent, who played as a defender. At club level, he spent his entire career with Nantes. At international level, he was part of France team that took part in the 1966 FIFA World Cup.

Honours 
Nantes
 French championship: 1965, 1966, 1973

References 
 Profile
 

1941 births
1966 FIFA World Cup players
FC Nantes players
Ligue 1 players
Association football defenders
France international footballers
French footballers
Living people
French people of Italian descent
Footballers from Saint-Étienne